was a Japanese samurai of the late Edo period. The 10th head of the Date clan's Iwade-Date clan branch, Kuninao served as a retainer of Sendai han. After the Meiji Restoration, Kuninao went to Hokkaidō and assisted in land reclamation. Among various other contributions to the founding of modern Hokkaidō, Kuninao planned what became the modern town of Tōbetsu.

Notes

1834 births
1891 deaths
Meiji Restoration
Samurai
Date clan